World's Funniest, formerly World's Funniest Fails, is an American reality television series produced by Dick Clark Productions and Jukin Media which made its debut on Fox on January 16, 2015. Hosted by Terry Crews, the funny videos show was inspired by the Jukin-owned YouTube channel FailArmy, in addition to Jukin's other properties. A panel of comedians views and analyzes the videos, which are divided into categories. In the first season each panel member selected a favorite in each category. Crews chooses a video in each category and decides on the "Fail of the Week" at the end. The panel member who picked the "Fail of the Week" receives the trophy. The show states in a disclaimer that viewer submissions are not accepted (as the majority of the videos were licensed to the show by Jukin); unlike America's Funniest Home Videos, this show makes no claim as to whether people in the videos were hurt by their reckless behavior.

The show was picked up for a second season to begin in the fall of 2015, but they were expected to be 8 or 9 unaired episodes ordered in February. The second season began airing November 6, 2015. The name was shortened, Crews said, because not everything funny is necessarily a fail. Also, the panel of judges no longer nominated favorite videos.

Although not officially cancelled, Fox has not ordered a third season of the series.

The show has no direct connection to another past Fox show of the near-same title, The World's Funniest!, which aired on the network from 1998 until 2000 and was produced by Brad Lachman Productions.

Reception
Brain Lowry of Variety said World's Funniest Fails "tries to concoct a game element around the clips that never really makes sense", but "if the goal was to develop a series that exhibits even a shred of originality or ingenuity, as 'Fails of the Week' go, hey, it looks like we already have a winner!"

Episodes

Season 1 (2015)

Season 2 (2015)

See also
Ridiculousness

References

External links
 

2010s American reality television series
2015 American television series debuts
English-language television shows
Fox Broadcasting Company original programming
Television series by Dick Clark Productions
2010s American video clip television series